Nie Yuan (born 17 March 1978) is a Chinese actor best known for his numerous television performances, some of his more notable roles include: Hu Fei in Fox Volant of the Snowy Mountain (2006); Li Ke in Carol of Zhenguan (2007); Zhao Yun in Three Kingdoms (2010), Tang Sanzang in Journey to the West (2011) and Qianlong Emperor in Story of Yanxi Palace (2018).

Early life
Nie was born in Zhenyuan County, Guizhou. His parents named his elder brother and him "Zhen" and "Yuan" respectively to remind them not to forget their hometown (Zhenyuan). When Nie recalled his adolescent days, he saw himself as a "youth-at-risk" then – he secretly joined the Guiyang Dance Class without informing his parents; when he was around 15 and 16 years old, he smoked, got into fights, and ran away from home. His worried parents sent him to enlist in the People's Liberation Army. Nie later enrolled in the Shanghai Theatre Academy after completing his service in the army. However, he behaved insolently in the academy and was almost expelled for poor conduct, but a teacher appealed for him to stay. After this incident, he became more mature and changed his rebellious ways.

Career
Nie first started acting when he was still in the Shanghai Theatre Academy. He was a "highly productive" actor, as he described in his own words, "In times when I was playing with my life, I could finish filming one episode in two days. I tried completing filming a 140 episodes television drama and one movie in a year. This can be taken as a record."

In 2000, after graduating from the academy, Nie and his first girlfriend, actress Huang Yi, collaborated in the television drama Wrong Carriage, Right Groom. Nie did not receive much acclaim for his performance while in contrast, Huang Yi was very successful. In 2001, Nie worked on Tianxia Liangcang with director Wu Ziniu, and was noted for his outstanding performance. Following that, Nie acted in the period dramas Love Legend of the Tang Dynasty, Eternity: A Chinese Ghost Story, Heroes of Sui and Tang Dynasties, Hanxue Baoma, Jingcheng Sishao, Han Women, and Carol of Zhenguan, and experienced a surge in popularity for his portrayal of good-looking young men dressed in ancient Chinese costumes.

In 2004, Nie was named by the Chinese media as one of the "Mainland's New Four Young Actors", along with Huang Xiaoming, Tong Dawei and Yin Xiaotian. That year, producer Zhang Jizhong was searching for someone to portray the lead character Yang Guo in his wuxia television series The Return of the Condor Heroes. Nie was a popular choice for "Yang Guo" and he participated in the audition as well, but eventually lost the role to Huang Xiaoming, who was not as popular as him then. Huang Xiaoming's performance in The Return of the Condor Heroes propelled him to fame, while in contrast, Nie did not advance much in his career. It was said that Nie and Huang developed a rivalry over the incident, but in a 2010 interview, Nie admitted that he did feel depressed when he lost the opportunity to act as Yang Guo, but also stated that his feud with Huang Xiaoming is not true.

In 2006, Nie starred in the wuxia drama Fox Volant of the Snowy Mountain.

From 2008 onwards, Nie's career took an upturn when he starred in the television series Three Kingdoms (2010) as military general Zhao Yun and Journey to the West (2011) as Tang Sanzang, adaptations of two of the Four Great Classical Novels of Chinese literature. He then acted in the films The Flowers of War as a soldier, The Last Supper as military general Xiang Zhuang, Avalokitesvara as Tang Emperor Li Yi, and Brotherhood of Blades as an eunuch.

Nie gained renewed recognition with his portrayal of Qianlong Emperor in the hit palace dramas Story of Yanxi Palace.

He later starred as Lu Buwei in the historical drama The Legend of Haolan.

Nie participated in the period drama series “Legacy” which will premiere exclusively on WarnerMedia’s regional streaming service HBO Go at an unspecified date later in 2021. “Legacy” is a 1920s-set drama that chronicles the lives of the wealthy Yi family and three sisters who vie to inherit their father’s shopping mall business. In a time of upheaval and uncertainty, the three sisters set aside their differences to keep the business afloat and save their family.

Personal life
When he was in his third year at Shanghai Theatre Academy, Nie met actress Huang Yi and started a relationship with her. They also acted together as a couple in the television drama Wrong Carriage, Right Groom. They broke up later as they pursued their respective careers.

Around 2003, Nie started a new relationship, this time with Liu Yun, whom he first met when they were working together in the television series Hanxue Baoma. They were later paired up again in Dahan Jinguo (2004). Nie and Liu separated in 2006, and they did not want to mention anything about their relationship again.

On September 28, 2008, Nie married actress Yang Guang. Their wedding was held in Beijing and more than 300 guests were invited. They divorced in 2012.

In early 2014, Nie married actress Qin Ziyue, who had a minor role in Journey to the West (2011). Their daughter was born on May 8 of that year.

Filmography

Film

Television series

Discography

Awards

References

External links
Nie Yuan's official website 
Nie Yuan's Sina profile page 
Nie Yuan's blog 

1978 births
Living people
People from Qiandongnan
Chinese male television actors
Chinese male film actors
Male actors from Guizhou
Chinese pop singers
Singers from Guizhou
Shanghai Theatre Academy alumni
21st-century Chinese male actors
21st-century Chinese male singers